"Smoke" is a song by Australian singer-songwriter Natalie Imbruglia. It was released on 5 October 1998 as the fourth and final single from her debut album Left of the Middle. The single reached  5 on the UK Singles Chart, No. 13 on the Icelandic Singles Chart, and No. 42 on the Australian Singles Chart. The video for "Smoke" was directed by Matthew Rolston. There are two versions of the video; one of which contains additional visual effects including Imbruglia's face appearing and disappearing within animated smoke.

Track listings 

Australian CD single
 "Smoke" – 4:39
 "Smoke" (Martyn Phillips mix) – 4:10
 "Smoke" (Ganja Kru mix 1) – 5:12
 "Smoke" (Way Out West mix 1) – 4:54
 "Smoke" (Beloved Hypoxic mix) – 5:00
 "City" (live version)

UK CD1
 "Smoke" – 4:39
 "Smoke" (Martyn Phillips & Marc Fox mix) – 4:10
 "City" (live in Barcelona) – 5:14
 "Smoke" (video)

UK CD2
 "Smoke" – 4:39
 "Smoke" (Ganja Kru mix 1) – 5:12
 "Smoke" (Way Out West mix 1) – 4:54
 "Smoke" (Beloved Hypoxic mix) – 5:00

UK cassette single
 "Smoke" – 4:39
 "Smoke" (Martyn Phillips & Mark Fox mix) – 4:10

European CD single
 "Smoke" – 4:39
 "Smoke" (Martyn Phillips mix) – 4:10

Charts

Release history

References 

1997 songs
1998 singles
Bertelsmann Music Group singles
Music videos directed by Matthew Rolston
Natalie Imbruglia songs
RCA Records singles
Songs written by Matt Bronleewe
Songs written by Natalie Imbruglia